Kristof Maes (born 19 April 1988) is a Belgian goalkeeper currently playing for Belgian Third Division side Cappellen.

Career
He has represented the Belgium national football team at Under-18 level. He has played for Belgian Pro League side Beerschot AC before moving to K.A.A. Gent during the 2012 summer transfer window.

He started his career at Belgian club KFCO Wilrijk.

References

 Guardian Football
 
 

1988 births
Living people
Belgian footballers
Association football goalkeepers
Beerschot A.C. players
K.A.A. Gent players